Gumanihat Railway Station serves the villages of Gumanihat and nearby areas like Kusaribari, Bailpari, Lotapota, Ramthenga, Chhat Dwarikamari, Dauaguri etc of  Cooch Behar district and Alipurduar district in the Indian state of West Bengal. It is 8 kms away from the city of Falakata.
The station lies on the New Jalpaiguri–New Bongaigaon section of Barauni–Guwahati line of Northeast Frontier Railway. This station falls under Alipurduar railway division.

References

Alipurduar railway division
Railway stations in West Bengal
Railway stations in Cooch Behar district